The Saint-Étienne Church is a church in Entrammes, Mayenne, France.

History 

The first church was built in the 7th century on the remains of Roman baths, which were rediscovered in 1987.

Today, little remains of the old paleochristian church save for a staircase that leads to the chancel, and also the base of the pulpit.

Gallery

See also

References

External links 

 Entrammes (St Étienne)

7th-century churches in France
Churches in Mayenne
Roman Catholic churches in France